Anne Lee Tzu Pheng (born May 13, 1946) is a Singaporean poet. She has five volumes of poems to her name; of these, the first three, Prospect of a Drowning (1980), Against the Next Wave (1988) and The Brink of An Amen (1991) were winners of the National Book Development Council of Singapore (NBDCS) Award. After converting to Catholicism, Lee Tzu Pheng added Anne to her name to reflect her new faith.

Life and career 
Born in Singapore (while it was under British rule), Lee Tzu Pheng was educated at Raffles Girls' Secondary School. She has a Ph.D. in English from the University of Singapore in 1973, from where she retired as a Senior Lecturer in its English Department. She is divorced from her ex-husband, Ban Kah Choon (who was once Head of English, National University of Singapore), and has one daughter, Jane Ban Li Hian.

Style of writing
Lee's poetry is meditative and lyrical in nature and with themes such as the individual's search for identity and larger unifying humanity in Against the Next Wave (1988) and The Brink of an Amen (1991). Her later poetry increasingly questions faith and religion, evident in her work, Lambada by Galilee (1999). However, her most anthologised work to date is an early poem, My Country and My People (1976), which expresses her ambivalent attitude towards patriotism and nationhood. For Lee, more often than not, poetry is an expression of the poet's experiences in life.

Works 

Like Edwin Thumboo, Lee is often seen as one of a generation of "nation-building" English writers in Singapore, whose work in the '50s-'70s questioned the identity of the newly independent nation. One of her early poems, "My Country, My People", was banned by the Singapore government due to fears that her reference to her "brown-skinned neighbours" would offend the Malay community of Singapore. Another early poem, "Bukit Timah, Singapore" was at one point included in an international selection of poetry for O-level literature students. Later poems heavily reference her Catholic faith. In 2014, she was inducted into the Singapore Women's Hall of Fame.

Poetry collections 

 Prospect of a Drowning (1980, Heinemann Educational Books) 
 Against the Next Wave (1988, Times Books International) 
 The Brink of an Amen (1991, Times Books International) 
 Lambada by Galilee & Other Surprises (1997, Times Books International) 
 Catching Connections: Poems, Prosexcursions, Crucifictions (2012, Landmark Books)  
 Short Circuits: Through the Catchments of Faith and Writing (2012, Landmark Books) 
 Sing a Song of Mankind: A Nursery Sequence for the Sixties (2012, Landmark Books) 
 Soul's Festival: Collected poems 1980-1997 (2014, Landmark Books) 
 Standing in the Corner: Poems from a Real Childhood (2014, Landmark Books) 
 Common Life: Drawings and Poems (2018, Ethos Books)

Awards 
 National Book Development Council Of Singapore Awards for her three books
 Singapore Cultural Medallion for Literature (1985)
 S.E.A. Write Award (1987)
 Gabriela Mistral Award (1996)

References 

Infopedia (National Library)

1946 births
Living people
National University of Singapore alumni
Singaporean poets
Recipients of the Cultural Medallion for literature
Singaporean women
S.E.A. Write Award winners
Raffles Girls' Secondary School alumni